The Whitesburg Historic District, in Whitesburg in Letcher County, Kentucky, is an  historic district which was listed on the National Register of Historic Places in 2006.  It included 86 contributing buildings, four contributing structures, and a contributing site.

It includes parts of Main St., Broadway, Bentley, Webb, and Hayes Aves., Church, Pine, Cowan, Madison Sts., River Rd., and Hazard Rd. in Whitesburg.  Altogether it includes 126 contributing and non-contributing resources.

It includes:
numerous residences
two churches
former soft drink bottling plant
two bridges
various commercial buildings
Letcher County Courthouse (non-contributing)

References

Historic districts on the National Register of Historic Places in Kentucky
Gothic Revival architecture in Kentucky
Buildings and structures completed in 1911
National Register of Historic Places in Letcher County, Kentucky
Whitesburg, Kentucky